Ughul Beyg (also Romanized as Ūghūl Beyg; also known as Oghūl Beyg and Oghūl Beyk) is a village in Afshar Rural District of the Central District of Takab County, West Azerbaijan province, Iran. At the 2006 National Census, its population was 1,236 in 320 households. The following census in 2011 counted 1,095 people in 318 households. The latest census in 2016 showed a population of 930 people in 309 households; it was the largest village in its rural district.

References 

Takab County

Populated places in West Azerbaijan Province

Populated places in Takab County